Yeshin may refer to several places in Burma:

Yeshin, Banmauk
Yeshin, Kale